Miguel Esteban Hesayne (26 December 1922 – 1 December 2019) was an Argentinian Roman Catholic prelate. He served as Bishop of the Diocese of Viedma from 1975 to 1995. He was born in Azul, Buenos Aires on 26 December 1922. He was ordained as a priest on 12 December 1948. He was appointed bishop of Viedma, Río Negro, on 5 April 1975, ordained on 4 June and installed on 8 July of the same year, at the age of 52.

Hesayne was the bishop of Viedma for 20 years, until 28 June 1995, when he resigned. He ruled his episcopal see during the dictatorial regime of the National Reorganization Process (1976–1983), and was among the very few members of the Argentine Catholic hierarchy to openly criticize its human rights abuses and crimes, such as the murder (masqueraded as a road accident) of bishop Enrique Angelelli by a military task force in 1976. Hesayne died on 1 December 2019 at the age of 96.

References

External links

 Catholic Hierarchy. Bishop Miguel Esteban Hesayne.
 Catholic News Service. 7 August 2006. Argentine church remembers bishop killed during dictatorship.
  Trial of the Argentine military juntas. 2 August 1985. Testimony of Bishop Hesayne.
  Umbrales. Interview.
  Río Negro Online. Interview.
  Clarín. 12 June 1999. Otro obispo criticó a Menem.
  Tlahui. Carta de un obispo argentino al Presidente De la Rúa

1922 births
2019 deaths
20th-century Roman Catholic bishops in Argentina
21st-century Roman Catholic bishops in Argentina
People from Buenos Aires Province
Roman Catholic bishops of Viedma